Bar Aftab-e Sofla (also Romanized as Bar Āftāb-e Soflá; also known as Bar Āftāb-e Pā’īn) is a village in Seyyedvaliyeddin Rural District, Sardasht District, Dezful County, Khuzestan Province, Iran. At the 2006 census, its population was 46, in 8 families.

References 

Populated places in Dezful County